Eliziane Pereira Gama Ferreira (born February 27, 1977) is a Brazilian journalist and politician. She was state deputy in the Legislative Assembly of Maranhão from 2007 to 2015 and federal deputy from 2015 to 2019. Since 2019, Gama serves as a Senator for the state of Maranhão.

References 

Social Democratic Party (Brazil, 2011) politicians
Members of the Chamber of Deputies (Brazil) from Maranhão
Members of the Federal Senate (Brazil)
Brazilian journalists
1977 births
Living people